Tyler Cain (born June 30, 1988) is an American basketball player for Derthona Basket of the Italian Lega Basket Serie A (LBA). He played college basketball for the University of South Dakota (USD). He is best known for being the inaugural winner of the Great West Conference Men's Basketball Player of the Year award in 2009–10, the conference's first as a Division I basketball league. As a senior that season, Cain became the second player in USD history to record 1,000 points and 1,000 rebounds. He is also USD's all-time leading shot blocker after compiling 361 during his career.

Early life
Cain was born in Rochester, Minnesota to parents Richard and Laurie and sister Erica. He attended John Marshall High School in his hometown where he was a star basketball player. Cain was twice named all-conference and once named honorable mention all-state. He was on the list for Minnesota Mr. Basketball and for McDonald's All-American. His specialty was shot blocking, where he set several school records that surpassed Oklahoma Sooner Longar Longar's previous JMHS records: blocks in a game (24), season (106) and career (188). As a senior in 2005–06, Cain averaged 19 points, 13 rebounds and 4 blocks per game.

College
In Cain's college career, the University of South Dakota was in a stage of transition for its athletics program. During his freshman (2006–07) and sophomore (2007–08) seasons, the Coyotes were a member of the North Central Conference in Division II. In 2008–09, USD joined the Great West Conference but were still classified as an independent school for certain sports, including basketball. Then, as a senior in 2009–10, the Coyotes finally became full-fledged members of the GWC in Division I.

Over his four-year career, Cain was South Dakota's best player. He started in 115 of the 120 games he played in and he set the top four USD single-season blocks totals. When his career ended, Cain finished as the school's 11th leading scorer (1,390), second leading rebounder (1,088) and tops in blocked shots (361). He compiled 36 career double-doubles while scoring in double figures on 74 occasions. Cain capped his career by winning the first ever GWC Player of the Year award.

Professional
In August 2010, Cain signed a contract to play for BK VEF Rīga of the Baltic Basketball League in Latvia.
In December 2012, after not getting job at higher level Cain returned to Latvia and signed with Barons Kvartāls. He averaged double-double in Latvian league (15.8 points and 10.6 rebounds). Before 2013–2014 season Cain signed with Fulgor Libertas Forlì in Italian second division, where he again averaged double-double (17.0 points and 11.1 rebounds)

On June 24, 2019, he has signed 2 years deal with Germani Basket Brescia of the LBA. Cain averaged 8.7 points and 6.5 rebounds per game.

On July 31, 2020, he parted ways with Brescia, and signed in the same league with Victoria Libertas Pesaro. In that season, Cain had the highest rebounds of the competition.

On Sunday July 11, 2021, Cain signed with Derthona Basket, newly promoted to the Lega Basket Serie A.

References

External links
South Dakota Coyotes bio

1988 births
Living people
American expatriate basketball people in France
American expatriate basketball people in Italy
American expatriate basketball people in Latvia
American men's basketball players
Basket Brescia Leonessa players
Basketball players from Minnesota
BK Barons players
BK VEF Rīga players
Élan Béarnais players
Fulgor Libertas Forlì players
JDA Dijon Basket players
Lega Basket Serie A players
Pallacanestro Varese players
Power forwards (basketball)
Reims Champagne Basket players
South Dakota Coyotes men's basketball players
Sportspeople from Rochester, Minnesota
Victoria Libertas Pallacanestro players